Dudrovo is a rural locality (a village) in Kisnemskoye Rural Settlement, Vashkinsky District, Vologda Oblast, Russia. The population was 8 as of 2002.

Geography 
The distance to Lipin Bor is 26.5 km, to Troitskoye is 3 km. Aksentyevo is the nearest rural locality.

References 

Rural localities in Vashkinsky District